Andy Collins may refer to:  
 Andy Collins (TV presenter) (born 1970), British television personality
 Andy Collins (game designer), role-playing game developer and "Sage" for Wizards of the Coast
 Andy Collins (artist) (born 1971), American artist

See also
 Andrew Collins (disambiguation)